The African Wildlife Defence Force (AWDF) (Afrika Wildsweermag (Afrikaans),  Force pour la défense de la faune sauvage Africaine (French), Força de defesa da vida selvagem Africana (Portuguese), Kikosi cha ulinzi ya wanyama pori barani Afrika (Swahili), 非洲野生動物防衛軍 (Chinese, traditional), 非洲野生动物防卫军 (Chinese, simplified)) is a private elite park ranger and anti-poaching organization based in Dungu, in the north-east of the Democratic Republic of the Congo. AWDF uses direct action tactics to protect wildlife and rainforests. The organization was founded in 2012 by Jean Kiala-Inkisi, a horticulturist and forester. It is proposed as an alternative to regular park ranger organizations who struggle with corruption, and seeks to eliminate the increasing levels of violence which poachers face.

History
The AWDF was found in 2012 after founder Jean Kiala-Inkisi travelled through Africa and visited orphanages, private game ranches, conservancies and national parks in countries such D.R. Congo, Kenya, Tanzania, South Africa and South Sudan. He was disappointed because, in his mind, the outside world was not doing enough to help the parks in central Africa. After he had conducted ground surveys on the border of the Democratic Republic of the Congo and South Sudan, and had been contracted on a private ranch in South Africa, he decided to train a team of Congolese rangers.

Two years later, he saw the need for a more specialized task force. And so, as of April 2014, the AWDF began with the selection of candidate rangers in the Democratic Republic of the Congo, South Sudan, Kenya and South Africa for training of Advanced Force (AFR) and Special Force (SFR) rangers. Founder Jean Kiala-Inkisi approached a former French Legionnaire in aim of providing a type of training that follows the tenets of the Special Forces and certain wildlife management courses.

Organization
The AWDF is a non-profit African private ranger organization; 80% of the organization's revenue is spent on its programs, while 20% of revenue is spent on administration and fundraising. It is supported by private and corporate donations, internet advertising and grants. The group is operated by both paid rangers and volunteers. The organization is committed to staying small, by operating with a few Special Operations Task Forces only. The AWDF is governed by a board of directors, including Jean Kiala-Inkisi. The board has several advisers, each addressing an area of expertise. The board consist of an Environmental Scientist, an Anthropologist, a Law Enforcement Advisor and a Financial and Management Advisor. They provide services from Anti-poaching, Wildlife management, Forestry management and Agroforestry consulting. But also Ranger training, Close quarter training and specialist rural security services.

The AWDF is open to all African citizens except for people from countries located north of the Sahel. They refuse African expats from outside Africa for ranger functions, this in order to draw radicalized candidates. In general non-Africans, foreigners coming from outside Africa can only work as an instructor or scientist.

Traditions of the AWDF
The AWDF rangers wear their insignia on the left side of the beret, to distinguish themselves from the regular park ranger organizations.

Honor code of the guardian
Art. 1 - Guardian, you are a volunteer, serving African wildlife with honor and fidelity.
Art. 2 - Each guard is your brother in arms whatever his nationality, race or religion. You maintain a close solidarity and unity with members as one family.
Art. 3 - Respectful of traditions, honor your superiors, discipline and comradeship are your strength; courage and loyalty are your virtues.
Art. 4 - Proud of your guardian status, proud of your elegant outfit, modest in behaviour, responsible for keeping barracks clean. 
Art. 5 - Elite Guard; you train rigorously, you maintain your weapon as your most precious, you maintain a good level of fitness. 
Art. 6 - The mission is sacred; you will carry it to the end and if necessary, risk your life.
Art. 7 - In combat, you act without passion or hatred, you respect the defeated enemy, you will never forsake your dead, nor your wounded, or your weapons.

Working field
As a private ranger services contractor the AWDF focusses on wildlife conservation and rainforest conservation. The AWDF has the expertise to also intervene in mangroves, lakes and waterways but does not work at sea. Their major working field is central Africa in the parks located in the border region of Democratic Republic of the Congo, South Sudan, Uganda and Central African Republic. This is because of the different rebel groups that infest the parks in this region. The AWDF wants to increase its presence in Africa by sending rangers to locations in Chad, Cameroon, Kenya, Tanzania, Namibia and South Africa. In the establishment of the AWDF it was recorded that the parks in central, eastern and southern Africa are prioritized for intervention. The AWDF does not send rangers to north Africa. In west Africa, the AWDF only sends rangers to Mali and Nigeria. The AWDF does not accept unsolicited proposals.

Departments

Convention on African Trade in Endangered Species of Wild Fauna (CATES)
The working group was formed in protest against what the AWDF calls the disastrous policies of CITES. The group works on wildlife law enforcement and promote non-conventional livestock farming like Insect farming, Crocodile farming and Game farming. They also examine the pros and cons of rhino horn farming.

Rangers
Rangers. The R or rangers are trained in Basic Military Training and Wildlife Management courses. An R conducts patrols also with a guard dog. Rangers can specialize in the sniffer dog unit.
Advanced Force Rangers. The AFR or Advanced Force Rangers are an elite ranger force in the AWDF, consisting of Parachute/Commando units. It is a support-reconnaissance unit. The training consists of 15 weeks of physical and psychological endurance. In addition to physical conditioning, the Advanced Forces learn hand-to-hand combat, survival techniques, military tactics, map reading and radio transmission. Followed by a 4 weeks wildlife management course and wildlife capturing course. Mutation to SFR is possible after five years experience as an AFR.
Special Force Rangers. The SFR or Special Force Rangers are a special forces unit in the AWDF. Members of the SFR are selected from the AFR units of the AWDF. After the main Advanced Forces course, a Special Forces operator will train three specialities. These are free fall from high altitude HAHO/HALO, underwater fighting skills and operating in mountainous terrain. Also, they all have to choose a team speciality: communications, explosives, armament, medical training or sniper. In real situations, the Special Force Rangers have to perform reconnaissance and surveillance missions in small groups deep into enemy territory, enact small offensive actions to arrest people, or to sabotage or impound materials. They are also trained to gain intelligence disguised as a civilian.
Special Operations Affiliate Ranger Group. The SOARG are a special forces unit in the AWDF. Members of the SOARG are coming from various elite groups around the world. Most are US veterans working Pro-Bono for a short or long-term basis.

Weapons
Remington Model 700
AK-47 The AWDF is considering to replace its AK-47 by both M16 rifles and the FAL SA58 mini OSW rifle from DS Arms.
Glock 17

Vehicles

Aviation
The AWDF is working on establishing its own air wing. It is working together with small flight operators from Bangui M'Poko International Airport, Goma International Airport and Wau Airport where it leases Cessna 206 aircraft.

Tree nursery
The AWDF focusses on the conservation of the rainforest from the basin of the Congo which has 70% of Africa's plant cover. The Congo Rainforest in Central Africa makes up a large portion of Africa's biodiversity with over 600 tree species and 10,000 animal species. The AWDF decided to start a nursery for Wild Edible Plants (WEP) & Non-Timber Forest Products (NTFP) and Tropical Hardwood. Scientists have begun collecting seeds and planting materials to start a nursery.

Wild Edible Plants (WEP) & Non-Timber Forest Products (NTFP). The AWDF want to guarantee food security by promoting agro-forestry and food forestry reforestation projects in central Africa and therefore created a list of 300 plants and tree species of the Congo that qualify for multiplication.
Tropical Hardwood. Because of the greed of China (Anno 2014) for forest exploitation and mead by the fact that since 1960 there was rarely replanted. The AWDF also created a list of 150 tree species for multiplication to avoid the alienation and destruction of the rainforest.

Actions

Hungerstrike 
On 13 August 2014, director Jean Kiala-Inkisi flew to Burbank, California to do a hunger strike. The goal was to get media attention in Hollywood for his cause and try to appear in the Ellen show. After sending 2500 emails and over 350 letters to celebrities, without having received any reply, he decided to talk with workers of Animal Defenders International (ADI) in Los Angeles. He was also invited by Rhino zoo keeper and Anti-Poaching Ranger Mike Daniels to visit the San Diego Zoo Safari Park and to look behind the scenes. On invitation of Matt Rossell, (ADI) Campaigns Director, a dinner took place with actress and animal activist Georja Umano. Later he also met the actress and editor Moon Hi Hanson. Because he was barely noticed as backpacking among the hundreds of homeless in LA and because the media was not interested to listen to his story, he decided to return on September 27, 2014.

Missions

Wanted Persons

Quest for Joseph Kony
Since 2012 a team of rangers is deployed near the border of Bengangai Game Reserve, Bire Kpatous Game Reserve and Mbarizunga Game reserve of neighboring country South Sudan to quest the Lord's Resistance Army (LRA) of Joseph Kony. The reward of up to $5m offered by the US State Department for information leading to the arrests or conviction of LRA leaders Joseph Kony, Okot Odhiambo, and Dominic Ongwen was the motivation to start this mission. But the Ugandan warlord has not been found. The rangers are protecting nature reserves in the region and support efforts to protect civilians.

Projects
Nutrecul Agroforestry Project

Partnerships

CSI Formation
On March 23, 2015 the AWDF officially announce its partnership with the France-based CSI-Formation for the creation of scientific units in the fight against poaching. The formation of these special units will, in the long term, become a new method of investigation to confound poachers in the central African region.

References

External links

Environmental organizations established in 2012
Ecology organizations
Wildlife rehabilitation and conservation centers
Wildlife conservation organizations
Environmental treaties
Endangered species
Wildlife smuggling
Military units and formations established in 2012
Business services companies established in 2012
Private military contractors
Security consulting firms
Animal rights organizations
Ranches
Animal welfare organisations based in the Democratic Republic of the Congo